Janis Cole (born 1954) is a Canadian filmmaker, producer, writer, editor and professor. She has directed several films over the span of her career. Most of these films were done in cooperation with her friend and professional partner, Holly Dale. Her most notable films include Cream Soda (1976) and Prison For Women (1981).

Early career 
Cole has had a long career, beginning with her time in school where she made short films with Dale. Their first, a short documentary called Cream Soda (1976), took a look at sex trade workers in the city of Toronto, Ontario. The film focuses on the body rub industry, while highlighting tricks of the trade as explained by the workers. Their next two films Thin Line (1977) and Minimum Charge No Cover (1976), which are documentaries as well, explored new ideas. The former takes a look into the maximum security mental health centre at Penetanguishene, Ontario, where Cole and Dale interviewed and photographed the inmates. The film is a serious take on crime, and the compassion one can feel towards such hardened criminals. Minimum Charge No Cover, again deals with the sex industry in Toronto. The film follows several subjects, from all walks of life, including a transsexual, homosexuals, hookers, transvestites, and female impersonators. These early films paved the way for Janis' career as a documentarian and filmmaker, focused on feminist and female themes.

First feature film 
Cole and Dale's first feature film, P4W: Prison for Women (1981), won the duo a Genie Award for Best Theatrical Documentary and is considered the most well known film of Cole's career. P4W follows the lives of inmates in Canada's only female prison at the time. The film focuses less on the crimes that have been committed and more on their stories, relationships, and isolation in the Kingston, Ontario penitentiary. The film centres on 5 women, which is only a small focus compared to the number of women who wanted to be involved in the film.

"There were about 100 inmates. We met with them maybe half a dozen times before we started to shoot. We really got to know a lot of the inmates, and we researched their crimes very well. There were about sixty women who wanted to be in the film; we narrowed the list to half a dozen people that we really wanted to focus on," said Cole in an interview for the book, The View from Here: Conversations with Gay and Lesbian Filmmakers by Matthew Hays.

This feature film was important in the acceptance of lesbian relationships in film, especially documentary. The lack of men present in this film made the idea more believable, helping audiences to accept the love between two female inmates shown on screen.

Later works  
After P4W came Hookers on Davie (1984, 86), which followed street prostitution, this time located in Vancouver. This film was well received, helping the pair to a second Genie Award.

Cole continued her work in the industry, making films such as Calling the Shots (1988) and Bowie: One in a Million (2001).

Calling the Shots (1988), is a documentary that sees Cole and Dale interviewing and recording women who work within the feature film business, reflecting on their time and trials over their careers.

Bowie: One in a Million (2001), Cole's final piece is a portrait of the life of Cathy Bowie, who was murdered by her husband George Jackson. After her life became a headline, Bowie faded into a statistic. This 10 minute short was a tribute to Bowie, who herself was a friend of Cole's.

Cole worked as a professor at OCAD University in Toronto for thirty years and is now Professor Emerita.

Filmography

See also 
 List of female film and television directors
 List of lesbian filmmakers
 List of LGBT-related films directed by women

References

Further reading
 

1954 births
Living people
Canadian documentary film directors
Canadian women film directors
LGBT film directors
Canadian lesbian writers
Film directors from Vancouver
Writers from Vancouver
Directors of Genie and Canadian Screen Award winners for Best Documentary Film
Canadian women documentary filmmakers
Canadian lesbian artists